Julie Annette Rovelstad Andem (born 4 July 1982) is a Norwegian screenwriter, director, and television producer. Andem is most famous for being the creator, screenwriter, director, and showrunner for the internationally acclaimed Norwegian young adult internet/television series Skam, which aired from 2015 to 2017 on Norway's public broadcasting network, NRK.

Career 
Andem worked in the children's division of NRK for several years. At NRK, she created and wrote the show Jenter, which means "girls" in Norwegian.

Skam 
Skam began because NRK executives wanted to reach more teenage girls in its programming. Andem, along with Mari Magnus who later became the social media director of the series, spent six months traveling around Norway and interviewing teenagers about their lives. She then auditioned over 1,200 young actors and then created characters around the cast.

Andem was the creator and showrunner of Skam, and she wrote and directed all 47 episodes throughout Skam's four seasons. Season 1 premiered on NRK in September 2015 and season 4 ended in June 2017.

The series was widely popular in Norway and globally. Many countries have made adaptations of Skam with Andem's storylines, including France's SKAM France, Germany's Druck, Italy's SKAM Italia, United States' SKAM Austin, Spain's SKAM España, Netherlands' SKAM NL, and Belgium's wtFOCK.

Other ventures 
In October 2019, it was announced that Andem signed a two-year contract with HBO to create and develop shows for the network.

Filmography

Awards

References

Living people
Norwegian screenwriters
Norwegian television producers
NRK people
1982 births
Norwegian women screenwriters